Marie-Andrée Cossette (born 1946) is a Canadian artist. Since 1976, Cossette has become known for her work in fine art holography. Cossette wrote the first fine arts master's thesis on the use of holography in art.  

In 1998 she exhibited at the MIT Museum. Her work is included in the collections of the National Gallery of Canada and the Musée national des beaux-arts du Québec.

References

20th-century Canadian women artists
21st-century Canadian women artists
1946 births
Living people
21st-century Canadian artists
20th-century Canadian artists
Academic staff of Université Laval